Marta Fran Kauffman (born September 21, 1956) is an American television writer and producer. She is best known as the co-creator of the NBC sitcom Friends with her longtime friend, David Crane. Both Kauffman and Crane were also executive producers of the show, along with Kevin Bright. Kauffman and Crane produced Veronica's Closet and Jesse. From 2005 to 2006 she was an executive producer on Related. Both writers were the creators of the HBO series Dream On. Without Crane, she co-created the Netflix series Grace and Frankie.

Early life and education
Born to a Jewish family in the Philadelphia suburbs, Kauffman attended Marple Newtown High School, located in the Marple Newtown School District near Philadelphia, where she was a thespian and student director of the school play "Our Town" in 1974. Kauffman attended Brandeis University and received her BA in theater in 1978. During her time there, she was a sister of Sigma Delta Tau sorority. Kauffman also studied acting at The Neighborhood Playhouse School of the Theater in New York City.

Personal life
Kauffman married Michael Skloff, who would later be the composer of the Friends theme song, and lived in Los Angeles. The couple had three children together. 

Kauffman is a registered Democrat.

Career
Okay Goodnight production company was headed by partners Kauffman, Robbie Rowe Tollin and Hannah KS Canter. Fox 21 Television Studios signed Okay Goodnight to multi-year first-look agreement in January 2020 starting with The Dreamers novel adaptation together with The Littlefield Company.

Filmography

Awards and nominations

References

External links
 
 

1956 births
Living people
Television producers from California
American women television producers
Showrunners
Writers from Los Angeles
Jewish American screenwriters
Brandeis University alumni
Writers from Philadelphia
American women screenwriters
American television writers
American women television writers
Screenwriters from California
Television producers from Pennsylvania
Jewish American television producers